Code of the West is an American 2012 documentary film directed by Rebecca Richman Cohen about the 2010 campaign to repeal Montana's legalization of medical marijuana.

References

Further reading

External links
 
 

2012 films
American documentary films about cannabis
Cannabis in Montana
Cannabis prohibition
Documentary films about Montana
2010s American films